Heinz Bongartz (31 July 1894, Krefeld – 5 May 1978, Dresden) was a German conductor and composer.  He was the first artistic manager of the Dresdner Philharmonie (Dresden Philharmonic Concert Halls) under the East German regime.

References

External links
  Heinz Bongartz discography

1894 births
1978 deaths
German male conductors (music)
People from Krefeld
20th-century German conductors (music)
20th-century German male musicians